Tilson Manuel Brito Jiménez (born May 28, 1972 in Santo Domingo, Dominican Republic) is a Dominican former professional baseball third baseman. He played Major League Baseball, KBO League baseball, and Chinese Professional Baseball League baseball.

Brito played parts of two seasons in Major League Baseball with the Toronto Blue Jays and the Oakland Athletics, last appearing in the major leagues in 1997.

He resurfaced in Korea in 2000, playing six seasons in the KBO League, for the SK Wyverns (2000–2001, 2004), the Samsung Lions (2002–2003), and the Hanwha Eagles (2005). For his KBO career, he hit .292 with 112 home runs and 391 RBI. With six seasons in the KBO, Brito had one of the longest careers of any foreign player.

From –, he played for the Uni-President 7-Eleven Lions of Chinese Professional Baseball League in Taiwan.

In the 2007 season, Brito had 33 home runs and 107 RBI, leading the league in both categories. His 33 homers set the record for most home runs in a single season of Chinese Professional Baseball League. (The record was later broken by Kuo-Hui Kao, who hit 39 home runs in the 2015 season.) Brito again led the CPBL in home runs and RBI in 2008, with 24 and 102 respectively.

Career statistics

Major League Baseball

Korea Baseball Organization

Chinese Professional Baseball League

References

External links

CPBL profile
Career statistics and player information from Korea Baseball Organization

1972 births
Charlotte Knights players
Dominican Republic expatriate baseball players in Canada
Dominican Republic expatriate baseball players in South Korea
Dominican Republic expatriate baseball players in Taiwan
Dominican Republic expatriate baseball players in the United States
Dunedin Blue Jays players
Gulf Coast Blue Jays players
Hanwha Eagles players
KBO League infielders
Knoxville Smokies players
Living people
Major League Baseball infielders
Major League Baseball players from the Dominican Republic
Modesto A's players
Oakland Athletics players
Samsung Lions players
SSG Landers players
Syracuse Chiefs players
Tacoma Rainiers players
Toledo Mud Hens players
Toronto Blue Jays players
Uni-President 7-Eleven Lions players
Uni-President Lions players